Mayulestes (Quechua: mayu river, + Greek: lestes, thief) is a genus of carnivorous metatherian that lived in what is now Tiupampa, Bolivia in the early Paleocene. It shared its habitat with fellow sparrasodont Pucadelphys, and a microbiotherid marsupial, Khasia.

References

Paleocene mammals of South America
Sparassodonts
Danian genera